A Missed Fortune  is a 1952 short subject directed by Jules White starring American slapstick comedy team The Three Stooges (Moe Howard, Larry Fine and Shemp Howard). It is the 137th entry in the series released by Columbia Pictures starring the comedians, who released 190 shorts for the studio between 1934 and 1959.

Plot
Shemp wins $50,000 for accidentally guessing the correct make of a car for a radio contest. The guys check in at the Hotel Costa Plente, and quickly spend their winnings. Their suite is furnished with many expensive items, which they systematically destroy. The hotel manager (Vernon Dent) discovers the destruction when he delivers a telegram to the stooges' suite; the telegram reveals that taxes withheld from Shemp's winnings reduce the $50,000 windfall to a minuscule $4.85.

Just then, three attractive gold diggers (Nanette Bordeaux, Vivian Mason, Suzanne Ridgeway), who are also guests at the hotel, connive their way into the boys' room. After twice being accidentally drenched with ice water thrown by the fellows, the ladies hit the stooges over the head with champagne bottles.

Production notes
Filmed over two days in 1951 (January 22–23), A Missed Fortune is a remake of 1938's Healthy, Wealthy and Dumb, using minimal stock footage. When Shemp falls onto the top of the bed, the footage is actually Curly borrowed from Healthy, Wealthy and Dumb (Curly can be heard yelling during the fall). Additionally, Larry taking a bath as well as the close-up of Moe yelling "Get this Henry the VIII off my neck!" is also stock. A slight inconsistency can be noted, as the pattern on the wood changes from shot to shot. The glue Moe accidentally pours onto his hotcakes, "Stik Fast Glue", is the same product Curly writes a slogan for in Healthy, Wealthy and Dumb.

This is the last Three Stooges film to be released during Curly Howard's lifetime. He died on January 18, 1952.

References

External links 
 
 
 A Missed Fortune at threestooges.net

1952 films
The Three Stooges films
American black-and-white films
1952 comedy films
The Three Stooges film remakes
Films directed by Jules White
Columbia Pictures short films
American comedy short films
1950s English-language films
1950s American films